Epilobocera is a genus of crabs in the family Epiloboceridae (formerly Pseudothelphusidae). It is the only genus in its family; this taxonomic arrangement follows the revision of the family Pseudothelphusidae by Álvarez and colleagues.

Species
Epilobocera contains the following species:
 Epilobocera armata Smith, 1870
 Epilobocera capolongoi Pretzmann, 2000
 Epilobocera cubensis Stimpson, 1860
 Epilobocera gertraudae Pretzmann, 1965
 Epilobocera gilmanii (Smith, 1870)
 Epilobocera haytensis Rathbun, 1893
 Epilobocera sinuatifrons (A. Milne-Edwards, 1866)
 Epilobocera wetherbeei Rodriguez & Williams, 1995

References

 
Decapod genera
Taxa named by William Stimpson